Eratosthenes of Cyrene ( – ) was a Greek polymath: a mathematician, geographer, poet, astronomer, and music theorist. He was a man of learning, becoming the chief librarian at the Library of Alexandria. His work is comparable to what is now known as the study of geography, and he introduced some of the terminology still used today.

He is best known for being the first person known to calculate the circumference of the Earth, which he did by using the extensive survey results he could access in his role at the Library; his calculation was remarkably accurate. He was also the first to calculate Earth's axial tilt, which has also proved to have remarkable accuracy. He created the first global projection of the world, incorporating parallels and meridians based on the available geographic knowledge of his era.

Eratosthenes was the founder of scientific chronology; he used Egyptian and Persian records to estimate the dates of the main events of the mythical Trojan War, dating the sack of Troy to 1183 BC. In number theory, he introduced the sieve of Eratosthenes, an efficient method of identifying prime numbers.

He was a figure of influence in many fields who yearned to understand the complexities of the entire world. His devotees nicknamed him Pentathlos after the Olympians who were well rounded competitors, for he had proven himself to be knowledgeable in every area of learning. Yet, according to an entry in the Suda (a 10th-century encyclopedia), some critics scorned him, calling him Beta (the second letter of the Greek alphabet) because he always came in second in all his endeavours.

Life
The son of Aglaos, Eratosthenes was born in 276 BC in Cyrene. Now part of modern-day Libya, Cyrene had been founded by Greeks centuries earlier and became the capital of Pentapolis (North Africa), a country of five cities: Cyrene, Arsinoe, Berenice, Ptolemias, and Apollonia. Alexander the Great conquered Cyrene in 332 BC, and following his death in 323 BC, its rule was given to one of his generals, Ptolemy I Soter, the founder of the Ptolemaic Kingdom. Under Ptolemaic rule the economy prospered, based largely on the export of horses and silphium, a plant used for rich seasoning and medicine. Cyrene became a place of cultivation, where knowledge blossomed. Like any young Greek at the time, Eratosthenes would have studied in the local gymnasium, where he would have learned physical skills and social discourse as well as reading, writing, arithmetic, poetry, and music.

Eratosthenes went to Athens to further his studies. There he was taught Stoicism by its founder, Zeno of Citium, in philosophical lectures on living a virtuous life. He then studied under Aristo of Chios, who led a more cynical school of philosophy. He also studied under the head of the Platonic Academy, who was Arcesilaus of Pitane. His interest in Plato led him to write his very first work at a scholarly level, Platonikos, inquiring into the mathematical foundation of Plato's philosophies. Eratosthenes was a man of many perspectives and investigated the art of poetry under Callimachus. He wrote poems: one in hexameters called Hermes, illustrating the god's life history; and another in elegiacs, called Erigone, describing the suicide of the Athenian maiden Erigone (daughter of Icarius). He wrote Chronographies, a text that scientifically depicted dates of importance, beginning with the Trojan War. This work was highly esteemed for its accuracy. George Syncellus was later able to preserve from Chronographies a list of 38 kings of the Egyptian Thebes. Eratosthenes also wrote Olympic Victors, a chronology of the winners of the Olympic Games. It is not known when he wrote his works, but they highlighted his abilities.

These works and his great poetic abilities led the pharaoh Ptolemy III Euergetes to seek to place him as a librarian at the Library of Alexandria in the year 245 BC. Eratosthenes, then thirty years old, accepted Ptolemy's invitation and traveled to Alexandria, where he lived for the rest of his life. Within about five years he became Chief Librarian, a position that the poet Apollonius Rhodius had previously held. As head of the library Eratosthenes tutored the children of Ptolemy, including Ptolemy IV Philopator who became the fourth Ptolemaic pharaoh. He expanded the library's holdings: in Alexandria all books had to be surrendered for duplication. It was said that these were copied so accurately that it was impossible to tell if the library had returned the original or the copy.
He sought to maintain the reputation of the Library of Alexandria against competition from the Library of Pergamum. Eratosthenes created a whole section devoted to the examination of Homer, and acquired original works of great tragic dramas of Aeschylus, Sophocles and Euripides.

Eratosthenes made several important contributions to mathematics and science, and was a friend of Archimedes. Around 255 BC, he invented the armillary sphere. In On the Circular Motions of the Celestial Bodies, Cleomedes credited him with having calculated the Earth's circumference around 240 BC, with a high precision.

Eratosthenes believed there was both good and bad in every nation and criticized Aristotle for arguing that humanity was divided into Greeks and barbarians, as well as for arguing that the Greeks should keep themselves racially pure. As he aged, he contracted ophthalmia, becoming blind around 195 BC. Losing the ability to read and to observe nature plagued and depressed him, leading him to voluntarily starve himself to death. He died in 194 BC at 82 in Alexandria.

Scholarly career

Measurement of Earth's circumference

The measurement of Earth's circumference is the most famous among the results obtained by Eratosthenes, who estimated that the meridian has a length of 252,000 stadia, with an error on the real value between −2.4% and +0.8% (assuming a value for the stadion between ). Eratosthenes described his arc measurement technique, in a book entitled , which has not been preserved.  However, a simplified version of the method has been preserved, as described by Cleomedes.

The simplified method works by considering two cities along the same meridian and measuring both the distance between them and the difference in angles of the shadows cast by the sun on a vertical rod (a gnomon) in each city at noon on the summer solstice.  The two cities used were Alexandria and Syene (modern Aswan), and the distance between the cities was measured by professional bematists.  A geometric calculation reveals that the circumference of the Earth is the distance between the two cities divided by the difference in shadow angles expressed as a fraction of one turn.

Geography

Eratosthenes now continued from his knowledge about the Earth. Using his discoveries and knowledge of its size and shape, he began to sketch it. In the Library of Alexandria he had access to various travel books, which contained various items of information and representations of the world that needed to be pieced together in some organized format. In his three-volume work Geography, he described and mapped his entire known world, even dividing the Earth into five climate zones: two freezing zones around the poles, two temperate zones, and a zone encompassing the equator and the tropics. This book is the first recorded instance of many terms still in use today, including the name of the discipline geography.  He placed grids of overlapping lines over the surface of the Earth. He used parallels and meridians to link together every place in the world. It was now possible to estimate one's distance from remote locations with this network over the surface of the Earth. In the Geography the names of over 400 cities and their locations were shown, which had never been achieved before.  However, his Geography has been lost to history, although fragments of the work can be pieced together from other great historians like Pliny, Polybius, Strabo, and Marcianus. While this work is the earliest we can trace certain ideas, words, and concepts in the historical record, earlier contributions may have been lost to history. 
 The first book was something of an introduction and gave a review of his predecessors, recognizing their contributions that he compiled in the library. In this book Eratosthenes denounced Homer as not providing any insight into what he now described as geography. His disapproval of Homer's topography angered many who believed the world depicted in the Odyssey to be legitimate. He also commented on the ideas of the nature and origin of the Earth: he thought of Earth as an immovable globe while its surface was changing. He hypothesized that at one time the Mediterranean had been a vast lake that covered the countries that surrounded it and that it only became connected to the ocean to the west when a passage opened up sometime in its history.
 The second book contains his calculation of the circumference of the Earth. This is where, according to Pliny, "The world was grasped." Here Eratosthenes described his famous story of the well in Syene, wherein at noon each summer solstice, the Sun's rays shone straight down into the city-center well. This book would now be considered a text on mathematical geography.
 His third book of the Geography contained political geography. He cited countries and used parallel lines to divide the map into sections, to give accurate descriptions of the realms. This was a breakthrough and can be considered the beginning of geography. For this, Eratosthenes was named the "Father of Modern Geography."

According to Strabo, Eratosthenes argued against the Greek-Barbarian dichotomy. He says Alexander ignored his advisers by his regard for all people with law and government. Strabo says that Eratosthenes was wrong to claim that Alexander had disregarded the counsel of his advisers. Strabo argues it was Alexander's interpretation of their "real intent" in recognizing that "in some people there prevail the law-abiding and the political instinct, and the qualities associated with education and powers of speech".

Achievements
Eratosthenes was described by the Suda Lexicon as a Πένταθλος (Pentathlos) which can be translated as "All-Rounder", for he was skilled in a variety of things: He was a true polymath. He was nicknamed Beta because he was great at many things and tried to get his hands on every bit of information but never achieved the highest rank in anything; Strabo accounts Eratosthenes as a mathematician among geographers and a geographer among mathematicians.
 Eusebius of Caesarea in his Preparatio Evangelica includes a brief chapter of three sentences on celestial distances (Book XV, Chapter 53). He states simply that Eratosthenes found the distance to the Sun to be "" (literally "of stadia myriads 400 and 80,000") and the distance to the Moon to be 780,000 stadia. The expression for the distance to the Sun has been translated either as 4,080,000 stadia (1903 translation by E. H. Gifford), or as 804,000,000 stadia (edition of Edouard des Places, dated 1974–1991). The meaning depends on whether Eusebius meant 400 myriad plus 80,000 or "400 and 80,000" myriad.
 Eratosthenes also calculated the Sun's diameter. According to Macrobious, Eratosthenes made the diameter of the Sun to be about 27 times that of the Earth. The actual figure is approximately 109 times.
 During his time at the Library of Alexandria, Eratosthenes devised a calendar using his predictions about the ecliptic of the Earth. He calculated that there are 365 days in a year and that every fourth year there would be 366 days.
 He was also very proud of his solution for Doubling the Cube. His motivation was that he wanted to produce catapults. Eratosthenes constructed a mechanical line drawing device to calculate the cube, called the mesolabio. He dedicated his solution to King Ptolemy, presenting a model in bronze with it a letter and an epigram. Archimedes was Eratosthenes' friend and he, too, worked on the war instrument with mathematics. Archimedes dedicated his book The Method to Eratosthenes, knowing his love for learning and mathematics.

Number theory

Eratosthenes proposed a simple algorithm for finding prime numbers. This algorithm is known in mathematics as the Sieve of Eratosthenes.

In mathematics, the sieve of Eratosthenes (Greek: κόσκινον Ἐρατοσθένους), one of a number of prime number sieves, is a simple, ancient algorithm for finding all prime numbers up to any given limit. It does so by iteratively marking as composite, i.e., not prime, the multiples of each prime, starting with the multiples of 2. The multiples of a given prime are generated starting from that prime, as a sequence of numbers with the same difference, equal to that prime, between consecutive numbers. This is the sieve's key distinction from using trial division to sequentially test each candidate number for divisibility by each prime.

Works
Eratosthenes was one of the most pre-eminent scholarly figures of his time, and produced works covering a vast area of knowledge before and during his time at the Library. He wrote on many topicsgeography, mathematics, philosophy, chronology, literary criticism, grammar, poetry, and even old comedies. Unfortunately, there are no documents left of his work after the destruction of the Library of Alexandria.

Titles
 Platonikos
 Hermes
 Erigone
 Chronographies
 Olympic Victors
 Περὶ τῆς ἀναμετρήσεως τῆς γῆς (On the Measurement of the Earth) (lost, summarized by Cleomedes)
 Гεωγραϕικά (Geographika) (lost, criticized by Strabo)
 Arsinoe (a memoir of queen Arsinoe; lost; quoted by Athenaeus in the Deipnosophistae)
 Ariston (concerning Aristo of Chios' addiction to luxury); lost; quoted by Athenaeus in the Deipnosophistae)
 The Catasterismi (Katasterismoi), a lost collection of Hellenistic myths about the constellations, was attributed to Eratosthenes.

See also
 Aristarchus of Samos, a Greek mathematician who calculated the distance from the Earth to the Sun.
 Eratosthenes (crater) on the Moon.
 Eratosthenian period in the lunar geologic timescale.
 Eratosthenes Seamount in the eastern Mediterranean Sea.
 Eratosthenes Point in Antarctica.
 Hipparchus, a Greek mathematician who measured the radii of the Sun and the Moon as well as their distances from the Earth.
 Posidonius, a Greek astronomer and mathematician who calculated the circumference of the Earth.

Notes

References

Further reading

 Aujac, G. (2001). Eratosthène de Cyrène, le pionnier de la géographie. Paris: Édition du CTHS. 224 p.
 
 
 
 
 
 
 
 
 
 Fuentes González, P. P., "Ératosthène de Cyrène", in R. Goulet (ed.), Dictionnaire des Philosophes Antiques, vol. III, Paris, Centre National de la Recherche Scientifique, 2000, pp. 188–236.
 Geus K. (2002). Eratosthenes von Kyrene. Studien zur hellenistischen Kultur- und Wissenschaftgeschichte. München: Verlag C.H. Beck. (Münchener Beiträge zur Papyrusforschung und antiken Rechtsgeschichte. Bd. 92) X, 412 S.
 
 
 Honigmann, E. (1929). Die sieben Klimata und die πολεις επισημοι. Eine Untersuchung zur Geschichte der Geographie und Astrologie in Altertum und Mittelalter. Heidelberg: Carl Winter's Universitätsbuchhandlung. 247 S.
 
 
 
 
 
 Marcotte, D. (1998). "La climatologie d'Ératosthène à Poséidonios: genèse d'une science humaine". G. Argoud, J.Y. Guillaumin (eds.). Sciences exactes et sciences appliquées à Alexandrie (IIIe siècle av J.C. – Ier ap J.C.). Saint Etienne: Publications de l'Université de Saint Etienne: 263–277.
 McPhail, Cameron (2011). Reconstructing Eratosthenes' Map of the World: a Study in Source Analysis. A Thesis Submitted for the Degree of Master of Arts at the University of Otago. Dunedin, New Zealand.
 
 
 
 
 
 Rosokoki, A. (1995), Die Erigone des Eratosthenes. Eine kommentierte Ausgabe der Fragmente, Heidelberg: C. Winter-Verlag
 Shcheglov, D.A. (2004/2006). "Ptolemy's System of Seven Climata and Eratosthenes' Geography". Geographia Antiqua 13: 21–37.
 
 
 
 Thalamas, A. (1921). La géographe d'Ératosthène. Versailles.

External links

 English translation of the primary source for Eratosthenes and the size of the Earth at Roger Pearse.
 Bernhardy, Gottfried: Eratosthenica  Berlin, 1822 (PDF) (Latin/Greek), Reprinted Osnabruck 1968 (German)
 Eratosthenes' sieve in Javascript
 About Eratosthenes' methods, including a Java applet
 How the Greeks estimated the distances to the Moon and Sun
 Measuring the Earth with Eratosthenes' method
 List of ancient Greek mathematicians and contemporaries of Eratosthenes
 New Advent Encyclopedia article on the Library of Alexandria
 Eratosthenes' sieve in classic BASIC all-web based interactive programming environment
 International pedagogical project : project :fr:La main à la pâte.
 Open source Physics Computer Model about Eratosthenes estimation of radius and circumference of Earth
 Eratosthenes, video
 Eratosthenes, Katasterismoi (or Astrothesiae), original text

270s BC births
190s BC deaths
276 BC births
3rd-century BC Egyptian people
3rd-century BC Greek people
3rd-century BC poets
3rd-century BC mathematicians
Ancient Greek astronomers
Ancient Greek geographers
Ancient Greek inventors
Ancient Greek music theorists
Ancient Greek geometers
Ancient Greek poets
Cyrenean Greeks
Deaths by starvation
Geodesists
Giftedness
Librarians of Alexandria
Number theorists
3rd-century BC geographers
Ancient Greece
3rd-century BC astronomers